The small green utaka (Nyassachromis leuciscus) is a species of cichlid endemic to Lake Malawi where it prefers areas with a sandy substrate.  This species can reach a length of  TL.  It can also be found in the aquarium trade.

References

small green utaka
Fish described in 1922
Taxonomy articles created by Polbot